William Dorsey Brown (June 29, 1938 – November 4, 2018) was an American football player. Brown was a halfback in the National Football League for 14 seasons, including 13 seasons with the Minnesota Vikings, and was named to the Pro Bowl four times.

Biography 
After graduation from Mendota High School, Brown played college football at the University of Illinois at Urbana-Champaign.

Brown was a second round choice (20th overall) of the Chicago Bears in the 1961 NFL Draft. Brown was traded to the Vikings before the 1962 season, for a fourth-round draft pick in the 1964 NFL Draft.

Brown holds many Vikings team records. Brown holds Vikings records for most games played by a running back (182), most consecutive games played by a running back (101), and most games started by a running back (111). He ranks fourth for career rushing yards (5,757), trailing Robert Smith (6,818), Adrian Peterson, and Chuck Foreman (5,887). Brown holds the team record for career rushing attempts (1627), and is tied for third in team history in rushing touchdowns (52). He ranks fourth in career points scored (456), behind Fred Cox, Fuad Reveiz, and Cris Carter. Brown's combined rushing and receiving yards (9237) ranks third, behind Darrin Nelson and Cris Carter. With the retirement of Don Perkins, Brown led active players in career rushing yards for much of the 1970 season, but had been passed by Leroy Kelly by the season finale.

Brown died on November 4, 2018. He was survived by his children Scott, Shelley, Kimberly, and Mick. Former Vikings and Oakland Raiders quarterback Rich Gannon was his son-in-law.

References

External links

1938 births
2018 deaths
People from Mendota, Illinois
American football running backs
Illinois Fighting Illini football players
Chicago Bears players
Players of American football from Illinois
Minnesota Vikings players
Western Conference Pro Bowl players